"Dorothea" (stylized in all lowercase) is a song by American singer-songwriter Taylor Swift. It was written by Swift and its producer Aaron Dessner, and is the eighth track on her ninth studio album, Evermore, which was released on December 11, 2020 through Republic Records. "Dorothea" is titled after the subject of its lyrics.

The song tells the story set around two fictitious characters of Tupelo, a woman named Dorothea and an unnamed subject, who were romantically involved in their youth, before the girl fled the town for Los Angeles to pursue her passion; "Dorothea" is the lover's ode to the now-famous Hollywood actress, seeing them confess their availability for her and try to convince her into returning to the simplistic life back hometown. Dorothea does visit the town in her winter break and rekindles the old flame with them, which is narrated by Dorothea herself in the fellow track "'Tis the Damn Season". Musically, "Dorothea" is a bittersweet Americana song composed using an ebullient honky-tonk piano, folksy guitars, and drums.

Upon release, "Dorothea" received enthusiastic reviews from music critics, who complimented Swift's ability to depict different narrative standpoints. Commercially, the song charted in Australia, Canada, Portugal, and the United States, and reached number 13 on the Billboard Hot Rock & Alternative Songs chart.

Background and release 
Taylor Swift conceived her eighth studio album, Folklore, as a set of mythopoeic visuals in her mind, a result of her imagination "running wild" while isolating herself during the COVID-19 pandemic. She surprised with the album's announcement on July 23, 2020, and released it the next day. To satiate her craving to explore more of the "folklorian woods" she visualized in her mind, Swift immediately developed another album as a conclusive counterpart to Folklore, titled Evermore. "Dorothea" was one of the two songs Swift had written for Big Red Machine, a band consisting of her Folklore personnel Aaron Dessner and Justin Vernon, the other being "Closure"; however, the two songs were eventually included on Evermore track-listing, where "Dorothea" placed eighth. Identical to Folklore launch, Swift made a surprise announcement of Evermore on December 10, 2020, and released it the next day.

Composition and lyrics 

"Dorothea" is an Americana song built around honky-tonk piano, tambourine jingles, and guitars, accompanied by "whirling" acoustics. It features characteristic notes of Swift's lower register in its hook. Her vocal range in the song spans from D3 to B4. The song is written in the key of E major and has a moderately fast tempo of 120 beats per minute.

Lyrically, "Dorothea" and another track from Evermore, "'Tis the Damn Season", together revolve around a fictitional story set in Tupelo, Mississippi. The story consists of two characters, Dorothea and an unnamed subject, who were high-school lovers in their hometown Tupelo, until Dorothea decided to move to Los Angeles to pursue a Hollywood career, breaking up with her partner, who never wanted to leave the town. The track "Dorothea" represents the her ex's perspective of their relationship with Dorothea after she becomes famous on television. They narrates their backstories of her, such as a skipped prom and feelings of separation, and attempts to convince Dorothea to return to the simplicity of rural life. The song has been compared to Folklore "Betty" due to Swift's take on male perspectives. "'Tis the Damn Season" is narrated by Dorothea, who expresses her thoughts about the ex when she returns to Tupelo for winter vacation and reconnects with them. In an Q&A session, Swift answered that Dorothea went to the same school as Betty, James, and Inez, the three characters named in "Betty", even though the two storylines do not intersect.

Reception 

Brodie Lancaster of The Sydney Morning Herald called "Dorothea" a "masterwork of a character study". NME critic Hannah Mylrea opined that "Dorothea", over "dancing piano lines", portrays the story of a lovelorn man "whose high-school sweetheart left to try and make it in Hollywood", incorporating vocal melodies reminiscent of Swift's self-titled debut studio album, Taylor Swift (2006). Annie Zaleski of The A.V. Club wrote that the song is for those "who struggle with feeling left behind by glamorous old friends". Writing for The Guardian, Alexis Petridis called  the song "a particularly luminous tune" that eschews "the old country cliche in which a star tells you their life of fame and luxury is nothing compared to the warm comfort of their old small-town life", instead has a protagonist look at a now-famous friend and attempt to convince their return to the simpler life. The Independent writer Helen Brown said that "Dorothea" has Swift slip "into the mind of a celebrity's hometown pal. Variety critic Chris Willman described the song's narrator as "a honey in Tupelo who is telling a childhood friend who moved away and became famous that she's always welcome back in her hometown", and praised Swift's "empathic wondering"–"how it feels to be at the other end of the telescope".

Commentators and fans have observed similarities between the character profile of Dorothea and that of American actress and singer Selena Gomez.

Commercial performance 
Upon Evermore release, all of the album's tracks debuted on both the US Billboard Hot Rock & Alternative Songs and the all-genre Hot 100 charts; "Dorothea" entered at number 13 on the former, and at number 67 on the latter. Elsewhere, it further reached number 47 on Australia's ARIA Singles Chart and number 34 on the Canadian Hot 100. The song debuted at number 47 on the Billboard Global 200 chart.

Credits and personnel
Credits adapted from the album's liner notes and Pitchfork.

 Taylor Swift – vocals, songwriter
 Aaron Dessner – producer, songwriter, recording engineer, bass guitar, electric guitar, acoustic guitar, piano and tambourine
 JT Bates – drum kit, percussion, recording
 Thomas Bartlett – piano, keyboards, synthesizers, recording
 Josh Kaufman – electric guitar and acoustic guitar
 Benjamin Lanz – modular synth
 Laura Sisk – recording engineer
 Jonathan Low – mixing, recording engineer
 Greg Calbi – mastering
 Steve Fallone – mastering

Charts

References

2020 songs
Songs about Mississippi
Songs written by Aaron Dessner
Songs written by Taylor Swift
Song recordings produced by Aaron Dessner
Taylor Swift songs